Hungry Valley is a valley located along the northern border of Los Angeles and Ventura counties, about  southwest of Gorman, California. The valley is notable for being a popular destination for off-road vehicle enthusiasts across California.

Geography
The valley is located within the Transverse Ranges of Southern California. The Freeman Mountains are located immediately east of the valley, and constitute the majority of the state vehicular recreation area.

Ecology
The valley is located at ecological transition zone between the semi-arid montane chaparral of the Transverse Ranges and the desert plant communities of the nearby Antelope Valley.

Recreation

The Hungry Valley State Vehicular Recreation Area is an off-road vehicle recreation area administered by the California Department of Parks and Recreation. The California Department of Parks and Recreation is tasked with the dual role of preserving the ecological integrity of the valley's chaparral plant communities while also managing the safe use of recreational vehicles in the area.

The valley includes a visitor center, public toilets, 11 campsites of varying sizes, and 6 off-road vehicle tracks for drivers of all skill levels and vehicle sizes. The valley is accessible via Gold Hill Road (paved) or Hungry Valley Road (dirt).

See also
Mountain Communities of the Tejon Pass
Peace Valley

References

External links

Hungry Valley SVRA map

Los Angeles County, California regions
Valleys of California
Valleys of Los Angeles County, California